Katherine Mayfield is a memoirist, short story writer, poet, and nonfiction author. Born in 1958 in St. Louis, Missouri, she was an actress in New York in the 1980s and '90s, and appeared Off-Broadway and on the daytime drama, Guiding Light. She has written for national magazines, local newspapers, and numerous websites, and has received funding from the Maine Arts Commission. She appeared on the NBC TV show "207" in 2013 to talk about her book, Bullied: Why You Feel Bad Inside and What to Do About It.

Awards
Mayfield's memoir on recovery from emotional abuse, The Box of Daughter, won awards in both the 2012 New England Book Festival and the 2012 Reader's Favorite Awards, and was nominated as a Finalist in the 2013 Maine Literary Awards.  Her short story, "The Last Visit", which is based on the last time she visited her father in hospice care, won the Honorable Mention award in the 2011 Warren Adler Short Story Contest.

Works
 Bullied: Why You Feel Bad Inside and What to Do About It. 2013, Maine Authors Publishing
 The Box of Daughter: Healing the Authentic Self. 2012, Maine Authors Publishing
 Dysfunctional Families: The Truth Behind the Happy Family Facade.  2012, The Essential Word Press
 The Box of Daughter & Other Poems. 2011, The Essential Word Press
 Acting A to Z: The Young Person’s Guide to a Stage or Screen Career, 2nd Edition. 2007, Watson-Guptill / Back Stage Books
 Acting A to Z: The Young Person’s Guide to a Stage or Screen Career. 1998, Watson-Guptill / Back Stage Books
 Smart Actors, Foolish Choices: A Self-Help Guide to Coping with the Emotional Stresses of the Business. 1996, Watson-Guptill / Back Stage Books

References

External links
 Official Website
 The Box of Daughter, Website

1958 births
Living people
American short story writers
American women short story writers
Writers from Maine
21st-century American women